is a high school in Sakata, Yamagata, Japan. It was established in 1920, and is located close to the center of Sakata on the site of a former Edo period fortification called Kamegaseki. There are approximately 600 students enrolled in the school.

Notable alumni 

 Makiko Mori, novelist

References

External links
  

High schools in Yamagata Prefecture
1920 establishments in Japan
Educational institutions established in 1920
Education in Yamagata Prefecture